New York's 4th State Senate district is one of 63 districts in the New York State Senate. It has been represented by Republican Phil Boyle since 2013, succeeding retiring fellow Republican Owen Johnson.

Geography
District 4 is in southwestern Suffolk County on Long Island, including portions of Babylon and Islip.

The district overlaps with New York's 1st and 2nd congressional districts, and with the 5th, 6th, 7th, 9th, 11th, and 12th districts of the New York State Assembly.

Recent election results

2020

2018

2016

2014

2012

Federal results in District 4

References

04